The Liceo classico Luca de Samuele Cagnazzi  is an Italian high school located in piazza Zanardelli 30, Altamura, Italy, close to the church Chiesa di San Domenico. It is named after Italian scientist Luca de Samuele Cagnazzi.

History 
The first educational institution, which was the ancestor of today's high school was a religious seminary, and precisely the archiepiscopal seminary, which began its activity in 1857 thanks to the bishop of the diocese of Altamura and Acquaviva. A few years later, a technical school was established in Altamura, while in March 1880, it became a high school and it was named after Luca Cagnazzi de Samuele.
It became a Regio Liceo Ginnasio with a decree enacted on 27 July 1908.

Location 
Before the school was established, the seat of the school was a convent of Dominican friars.

Collection of scientific instruments 
The high school stores a valuable collection of ancient scientific instruments, some of which date back to the period of activity of the University of Altamura (1747-1812) and probably some of them are likely to date back to the 18th century.

Activity 
Since 1994 the school organizes every year an international contest of classical theater and this event takes place in partnership with the ancient city theater Teatro Mercadante, which has been recently reopened.

References

Bibliography

See also 
 Altamura

Altamura
Schools in Altamura